The 1965 Northwestern Wildcats team represented Northwestern University during the 1965 Big Ten Conference football season. In their second year under head coach Alex Agase, the Wildcats compiled a 4–6 record (3–4 against Big Ten Conference opponents) and finished in sixth place in the Big Ten Conference.

The team's offensive leaders were quarterback Denny Boothe with 487 passing yards, Bob McKelvey with 587 rushing yards, and Cas Banaszek with 333 receiving yards.  McKelvey, Banaszek, and tackle Jim Burns were selected by the Associated Press as second-team All-Big Ten players.

Schedule

References

Northwestern
Northwestern Wildcats football seasons
Northwestern Wildcats football